Jean Milesi (born 24 June 1935) is a French former professional racing cyclist. He rode in seven editions of the Tour de France.

References

External links
 

1935 births
Living people
French male cyclists
People from Digne-les-Bains
Sportspeople from Alpes-de-Haute-Provence
Cyclists from Provence-Alpes-Côte d'Azur